Giovanni Antonio Canal or Canaletto (1697–1768) was Venetian painter famous for his landscapes.

Canaletto may also refer to:
 Bernardo Bellotto or Canaletto (1721–1780), Venetian urban landscape painter, nephew and pupil of Canal, famous for his vedutes of Warsaw and Dresden
 8123 Canaletto, a Main-Belt asteroid